Lloyd Lamont "Monty" Gordon (29 April 1932 – 26 July 2019) was a Canadian bobsledder and businessman. He competed in the four-man event at the 1964 Winter Olympics.

https://www.bobsleighcanadaskeleton.ca/en/news/?id=516

References

1932 births
2019 deaths
Canadian male bobsledders
Olympic bobsledders of Canada
Bobsledders at the 1964 Winter Olympics
People from Wellington County, Ontario